Darvish Khak may refer to:
 Darvish Khak-e Bala
 Darvish Khak-e Marzun
 Darvish Khak-e Pain